Apstar 6 is a communications satellite built by Alcatel Space, a subsidiary of Alcatel, and was boosted into orbit on April 12, 2005, by Long March 3B launcher from Xichang Satellite Launch Center in China. It provides APT Satellite, a satellite operator in the Asia Pacific region, with  broadband media and television services.  
It is fitted with 38 C-band transponders and 12 Ku band transponders. China is covered with a dedicated high power Ku band beam for broadband multimedia transmission. It is the second model of the Spacebus 4000.  The transponders have a reduced C-band receiving dish over a wide footprint, which extends across India, China and Australia.

It is significant in enhancing cooperation between Alcatel Space and China as a follow up to the SINOSAT satellite.  Apstar 6 was built as an ITAR-free satellite, containing no restricted U.S. components.  Under the U.S. ITAR regulations, U.S. satellite components may not be exported for launch on Chinese rockets.  However, the U.S. Department of State did not accept the ITAR-free status of these satellites and fined the US company Aeroflex $8 million for selling ITAR components. In 2013, Thales Alenia discontinued its ITAR-free satellite line.

References

External links

Alcatel press release
 APT website
 

Communications satellites in geostationary orbit
Spacecraft launched in 2005
Satellites using the Spacebus bus
Communications satellites of China
2005 in China
Spacecraft launched by Long March rockets